TIG or Tig or variation, may refer to:

Tig
Tig may refer to:

Jimmy Tig (1938–2007), American R&B singer
Patricia Maria Țig (born 1994), Romanian tennis player
Tig Notaro (born 1971), American stand-up comic
Tig Trager, a character in the television series Sons of Anarchy
Tig, a character from the short film Woolly and Tig

Tig (film), a 2015 documentary about comic Tig Notaro
The Tig (website), a website founded by Meghan Markle
Tig, another name for the game tag

TIG
TIG may refer to:

Change UK or The Independent Group for Change, a former British political party
Trends in Genetics, an academic journal
Tungsten inert gas welding, or gas tungsten arc welding
 TIG SA Tôlerie Industrielle de la Gruyère SA

tig
tig may refer to:

 a tig, a large sharing drinking mug, usually with four handles
 Tig (Tigrinya language), Ethiopian/Eritrean prefix to several words
 Tigre language (ISO 639 code: tig)
 tig (software), an ncurses-based text-mode interface for git

See also

 TIG1 (tazarotene-induced gene-1)
 TIG Tennis Classic, California women's tennis open
 Tigs, a character from The Shiny Show
 TIGS, a grammar school